Dana Fillingim (November 6, 1893 – February 3, 1961) was a pitcher in Major League Baseball. He played for the Philadelphia Athletics, Boston Braves, and Philadelphia Phillies. Fillingim's key pitch was the spitball, and he was one of the pitchers allowed to continue throwing the pitch after it was outlawed in 1921. His best season was in 1921, when he was 15-10 with the Boston Braves. 

He was a good hitting pitcher in his 8-year major league career, recording a .209 batting average (77-for-368) with 2 home runs and 26 RBI. Fillingim was a good fielding pitcher in the majors, posting a .983 fielding percentage with only 6 errors in 350 chances, which was 26 points higher than the league average at his position.

References

External links

1893 births
1961 deaths
Major League Baseball pitchers
Philadelphia Athletics players
Boston Braves players
Philadelphia Phillies players
Baseball players from Columbus, Georgia
Cordele Babies players
Cordele Ramblers players
Charleston Sea Gulls players
Indianapolis Indians players
Beaumont Exporters players
San Antonio Bears players
Rochester Tribe players